A doughnut or donut is a maneuver performed while driving a vehicle. Performing this maneuver entails rotating the rear or front of the vehicle around the opposite set of wheels in a continuous motion, creating (ideally) a circular skid-mark pattern of rubber on a carriageway and possibly even causing the tires to emit smoke from friction. 

The move was popularized as a race celebration by Jeff Gordon. He first did it after winning the NASCAR Cup Series championship at Atlanta Motor Speedway in 1995, even though Ron Hornaday Jr. had also done it prior that year after winning a race in the NASCAR SuperTruck Series. Alex Zanardi also spun his tires after the 1997 Long Beach Grand Prix, where he performed the manoeuvre as a way to give back to the Long Beach fans and the atmosphere they produced for the teams and racers. He continued to use it as a form of celebration throughout his racing career. The move has now become the post-race celebration of choice for many victorious drivers. Other popular drivers known to be among the first ones to perform this maneuver are Tony Stewart after winning the 1999 Exide NASCAR Select Batteries 400 and Dale Earnhardt after winning the 1998 Daytona 500. In Formula One, there are limits on the number of engines and transmissions a team may use in a season, so doughnut celebrations are normally saved for the last race of the season where the hardware will no longer be needed.

Doughnuts are more easily performed on wet and frozen surfaces (ice and snow), as well as on loose surfaces, such as dirt. When performed in the snow, it is more often done to have fun than it is to make an earnest attempt at creating the circular skid mark pattern. In Australia, doughnuts performed in dust or mud are colloquially referred to as "circle work".

Performing the doughnut maneuver can be hazardous. Strain is placed on the vehicle's suspension and drivetrain, which may result in mechanical breakdown with loss of control. Tires are also subject to severe wear which may result in a sudden loss of pressure or blowout. In snow, however, the strain placed on the vehicle is much less. Hence, rally drivers prefer to learn car control in such situations.

See also
Drifting (motorsport)
Burnout

References

External links
Modern Racer - Driving Tips - Doughnuts

Hazardous motor vehicle activities
Driving techniques
Articles containing video clips